is a 1975 song by Miyuki Nakajima. She redubbed it in 1993 for her album Jidai: Time Goes Around. A popular cover was also released by Hiroko Yakushimaru in 1988. Hayley Westenra translated it and sung it in Hayley Sings Japanese Songs in 2008. An instrumental version was used in the opening credits of Leiji Matsumoto's series Cosmo Warrior Zero.

It won the grand prize at the World Popular Song Festival in November 1975. It was released as a single in December 1975 and sold over 2 million copies. In 2007 it was included in the Nihon no Uta Hyakusen.

References

1975 songs
Miyuki Nakajima songs
Japanese film songs